Pterostylis flavovirens, commonly known as the coastal banded greenhood, is a plant in the orchid family Orchidaceae that is endemic to South Australia. As with other similar orchids, non-flowering plants differ from those in flower. Flowering plants have up to seven pale to translucent green flowers with darker green stripes. The flowers have an insect-like labellum which is yellowish green with a slightly darker green stripe along its centre. Non-flowering plants have a rosette of leaves on a stalk, but flowering plants lack the rosette, instead having three to six stem leaves.

Description
Pterostylis flavovirens, is a terrestrial,  perennial, deciduous, herb with an underground tuber. Flowering occurs from July to September.

Taxonomy and naming
This orchid was first formally described in 2006 by David Jones who gave it the name Bunochilus flavovirens. The description was published in the journal Australian Orchid Research from a specimen collected near Port Lincoln. In 2008 Robert Bates changed the name to Pterostylis flavovirens. The specific epithet (flavovirens) is derived from the Latin words flavus meaning “golden-yellow” or "yellow" and virens meaning "green", referring to the colour of the labellum.

Distribution and habitat
Pterostylis flavovirens is found in coastal areas of the Eyre Peninsula, Yorke Peninsula, Southern Lofty, Kangaroo Island and South-Eastern botanical regions of South Australia. It often grows in accumulated leaf litter under small trees and shrubs.

References

flavovirens
Orchids of South Australia
Plants described in 2006